Karina Ramos Leiton (born July 14, 1993, in Heredia, Costa Rica) is a Costa Rican TV Host, model and beauty pageant titleholder who was crowned Miss Costa Rica 2014 and represented her country at Miss Universe 2014.

Career 
After winning Miss Costa Rica 2014, her career took off to international level. She has been modeling worldwide and walking at New York Fashion Week, Los Angeles Fashion Week and Miami Swim Week.

Pageantry
She has been a finalist in various beauty pageants including Miss International Supranational, International Livestock Queen, International Peace Queen, and Miss Tourism Latino.

Miss Supranational 2012
Karina represented Costa Rica at the third session of Miss Supranational 2012 in Plock, Poland. She placed in the Top 20. Became the first Costa Rican to advance in the semifinals at Miss Supranational.

Miss Belleza Americana 2013
Karina represented Costa Rica at the Miss Belleza Americana 2013. She was the 3rd runner-up and won the Best Body award.

Reina Internacional de la Paz 2013
Karina represented Costa Rica at the Reina Internacional de la Paz 2013 and won the title.

Reina Internacional de la Ganaderia 2013
Karina represented Costa Rica at the Reina Internacional de la Ganadería 2013, where she was the 1st runner-up and was awarded the  Reina de los periodistas.

Miss Turismo Latino 2013
Karina represented Costa Rica at the Miss Turismo Latino 2013, where she was the 3rd Runner-up and was awarded as Miss Culture.

Miss Costa Rica 2014
Karina was one of the 60 pre-delegates in the competition, and the representative of San José Province. She placed first in individual skills and won the title of Miss Costa Rica and represented Costa Rica in Miss Universe 2014.

References

External links

Living people
Costa Rican beauty pageant winners
Miss Universe 2014 contestants
1993 births
People from Heredia Province
Costa Rican female models